Frank A. Meyer (born 6 January 1944, in Biel/Bienne) is a Swiss journalist.

Meyer is the media consultant of Ringier Inc., the largest Swiss publishing house (Blick, Le Temps...), he is also Blick’s main strategist.

Life
Growing up in the bilingual Biel as the son of a watchmaker, Meyer did an apprenticeship as a typesetter. From 1968 to 1980 he was a partner of Mario Cortesi at the media company in his hometown of Biel.

References

1944 births
Living people
People from Biel/Bienne
Swiss businesspeople
Swiss journalists
Recipients of the Cross of the Order of Merit of the Federal Republic of Germany